The 2015–16 Fort Wayne Mastodons women's basketball team represents Indiana University – Purdue University Fort Wayne during the 2015–16 NCAA Division I women's basketball season. The Mastodons, led by ninth year head coach Chris Paul and played their home games at play their home games at the Hilliard Gates Sports Center, with one home game at the Allen County War Memorial Coliseum. They were members of The Summit League. They finished the season 7–23, 2–13 in Summit League play to finish in a tie for seventh place. They lost in the quarterfinals of The Summit League women's tournament to South Dakota State.

At the end of the season, head coach Chris Paul's contract was not renewed. He posted a record of 125–195 in 9 seasons.

Roster

Schedule

|-
!colspan=9 style="background:#4169E1; color:#FFFFFF;"| Exhibition

|-
!colspan=9 style="background:#4169E1; color:#FFFFFF;"| Non-conference regular season

|-
!colspan=9 style="background:#4169E1; color:#FFFFFF;"| The Summit League regular season

|-
!colspan=9 style="background:#4169E1; color:#FFFFFF;"| The Summit League Women's Tournament

References

Purdue Fort Wayne Mastodons women's basketball
IPFW
Fort Way
Fort Way